The OC&C Ringvaart Regatta is a rowing race over the very long distance of . The D.S.R.V. Laga (a student rowing club in Delft) has organised the head race annually since 1976.

History
In 1976 the Laga club members celebrated their centennial. As part of their anniversary they challenged De KSRV 'Njord' (The Royal Student Rowing club 'Njord') for this 100 km marathon. Soon other student rowing clubs heard about the race and the Ringvaart Regatta became an annual event.

Trail
The rowing race starts at the Kagerplassen and rounds the Ringvaart counterclockwise once before returning to the Kagerplassen. The rowers then enter the Vliet canal. The finish line is in Delft.

External links
Official website (not secure)
Race trail on maps.google.com
DSRV Laga website

References
 Wubbo Ockels, about the ringvaart regatta in the NRC Handelsblad

Head races
Rowing competitions in the Netherlands